, also known as Apo Mekhanes Theos Gigantic Formula, is a Japanese anime television series that aired on TV Tokyo from April 4, 2007, to September 26, 2007. A manga adaptation by Shōhei Oka was serialized concurrently in Dengeki Daioh.

Overview
The series is set in the year 2035 A.D. After the excavation of Regions around the World 12 gigantic heads resembling the Greek Gods were uncovered. So far in the series the following countries/regions have been confirmed as having obtained one of the heads, Italy Roma Republic, Empire of North America, Central China, Caribbean, Venezuela Republic, Original Greece, Great British Kingdom, France Union, East European Russia, Federated Egypt, Africa Arabia, Japan Republic, Unified German Deutsch, and Hindustania. Each of the heads give out powerful energy capable of destroying large areas. Shortly after the 12 heads excavation a large portion of Earth was engulfed in flames. The areas include most of [North] Africa, South America, and the entire Middle East, this phenomenon was called the "Equatorial Winter". For a time after the disaster the Nations of the world were unable to contact or get Satellite feed of each other due to a large wall of energy separating them.

Subsequently after each of the countries hired translators, who can speak to the heads and translate for them. The heads tell the countries to, Build them armor to fight with. So the countries each built large steel mechs with the heads as the power source to fight against other countries, To unify the World, and begins WWW (World's Wisest War).

Character histories and Gigantic Status

Japan Republic
Japan Republic's X-Onyxs defeated Empire of North America's Jupiter-II.
Japan Republic's Sxano-X (really no. 13) defeated Japan Republic's X-Onyxs (the original no. 10).

The main protagonist, he is the pilot of Sxano-X, and is 13 years old.

The female lead, a translator for Sxano-X. She is 14 years old.

The chief engineer for Sxano-X. She is a 10-year-old genius who likes to be called .

She is the Commander for the army that involves Sxano-X, 32 years old.

The Second in Command for the army that involves Sxano-X. He is 53 years old.

Central China
Central China's Xuanwushan-III was defeated by Japan Republic's Sxano-X in their second battle.

He was the pilot of Xuanwushan-III. After the defeat of Central China he became the trainer for Shingo and Mana. He is 24 years old, and is Chau-Yan's husband.

She was the translator of Xuanwushan-III. After the defeat of Central China she became the trainer for Shingo and Mana. She is 21 years old, and is married to Wen-Yee.

East European Russia
East European Russia was defeated by Japan Republic's Sxano-X in their third battle.
Sxano was able to endure the effects of Eunova's ultimate weapon "The Hundred eyes of Argos"

He is the pilot of Eunova-VIII, 15 years old. Later, when he and Tatyana are defeated by Japan's Republic, Sxano-X, he is a cheerful guy with a good attitude and is hard to hate. He becomes quick friends with the protagonists and worries about them. He seems to have a romantic relationship with Eunova's translator, and his partner, Tatyana, despite her being older.

The translator of Eunova-VIII, 32 years old. She is shown as a sensible and mature woman and corrects Sergei often about being polite and what not. She seems to have a romantic relationship with Sergei, seen kissing in one episode.

Federated Egypt Africa Arabia
Nephthys-IX lost to East European Russia's Eunova-VIII within a few minutes of encounter.

The pilot of Nephthys-IX, 22 years old.

Nephthys-IX's translator, 24 years old. He hated Mariam for a while thinking that she was a hypocrite, after going into battles with her, he realized she isn't a hypocrite at all.

Original Greece
Cheiron-V was defeated and destroyed by Federated Egypt Africa Arabia's Nephthys-IX. Both the pilot and translator died during the battle.

The pilot of Cheiron-V. He has a ring which it was intended to give to Christy, but never had the courage to do so. It seems that he doesn't get along with Hasan as well. He died during the battle with Federated Egypt Africa Arabia's Nephthys-IX, aged 23.

The translator of Cheiron-V. He seems to have a crush on Christy as well, and does not get along with Muhammad very well. He died during the battle with Nephthys-IX, aged 22 years.

The chief engineer of Cheiron-V. Both Muhammad and Hasan likes her, but she's in love with someone else. She is 21 years old.

Great British Kingdom
Griffine-VI was lost from the misfire (claimed by the UN) of Italy Roma Republic's Vulcanus-I and Unified German Deutsch's Minervas-XI's long range battle.

She is the pilot of Griffine-VI, 20 years old. Initially he does not like Daniel because she thinks he's a criminal, but then later she got along with him.

The translator of Griffine-VI, 51 years old. He was a butler for a British royal, then his master assassinated his wife and framed him to be the killer. He stayed in jail until he was called to be the translator of Griffine-VI.

France Union
Diane-VII was lost from the misfire (claimed by the UN) of Italy Roma Republic's Vulcanus-I and Unified German Deutsch's Minervas-XI's long range battle.

The pilot of Diane-VII, 19 years old. He is the step brother of Sylvie, and cares about her very much. It seems that they are romantically in love instead of brother-sister love.

She serves as Diane-VII's translator, 16 years old. Initially she hated her step brother because she thinks his mom stole her dad away from her, then realized he cares about her a lot. It seems that they are romantically in love instead of brother-sister love.

Italy Roma Republic
Vulcanus-I lost the long range battle against Unified German Deutsch's Minervas-XI.

The pilot of Vulcanus-I, 11 years old. He is an orphan, but very energetic. He uses the money paid by the military to buy food for the poor. He and Lucrezia were tricked by the military to fire missiles at the place where Diane-VII and Griffine-VI had their battle.
  

The translator of Vulcanus-I, 23 years old. She is treated as a saint, and is admired by many people. She was a prostitute after the Equatorial Winter had occurred in order to survive. She and Leone were tricked by the military to fire missiles at the place where Diane-VII and Griffine-VI had their battle.

Appendix:  Though the show leaves you thinking these two die in their battle with Minervas, they are shown in the last episode.

Unified German Deutsch
Minervas-XI lost the battle against Empire of North America's Jupiter-II.

Minervas-XI's pilot, 15 years old. She looks younger than she actually is. She is always cheerful and cares about Michael deeply, so much that she'd sacrifice herself in order to protect him. She is the one who finally defeats Vulcanus-I with their cannon, in order to protect Michael but before doing so she repeatedly says, "it's so sad..." and finally, "it's so sad...but I have to protect Michael." It is shown that she too has a code for child prodigies, and it isn't clear whether or not she is one or that she was a failed prodigy.

Minervas-XI's translator, 12 years old. He's a child prodigy like Utsumi Amano. He is an overconfident young boy who believes he is better than normal people due to him being a born prodigy. He seems to not like Elenore due to her innocence and naivety, however, shows that he truly cares for her when she protects him from Vulcanus-I. He vows that he'd protect her, whom he now says is his most precious person. When they are battling against Jupiter-II, he and Elenore are abandoned by their team and left for dead, his top objective then was to save Elenore. They lose quickly, Minervas-XI was destroyed but they were saved and are seen huddled together with a blanket over them.

Empire of North America
Jupiter-II lost the battle against Japan's X-Onyxs.

The pilot of Jupiter-II, 45 years old. He's in the military.

The translator of Jupiter-II, 14 years old. She is Zion's daughter.

Caribbean Venezuela Republic
Ceres-IV lost the battle against Hindustania's Isthar-XII.

Ceres-IV's pilot. She is 17 years old, and is Amalia's daughter.

The translator of Ceres-IV. She is 35 years old.

Hindustania
Isthar-XII lost the battle against East European Russia's Eunova-VIII.

The pilot of Isthar-XII, 20 years old. She first appeared in episode one, and is a fortune teller.

The translator of Isthar-XII, 21 years old. She is a researcher on the OXII. She is against Lily in theoretical ways.

Gigantics
The countries and their mechas are:

Staff
The show is produced by Bandai Visual and TV Tokyo with anime production by Brains Base.  The show has been broadcast by: AT-X (2007-05-30); TV Aichi (2007-04-05); TV Hokkaido (2007-04-17); TV Osaka (2007-04-11); TV Setouchi (2007-04-11); TV Tokyo (2007-04-04); and TVQ Kyushu Broadcasting Co., Ltd. (2007-04-10).

Director: Keiji Gotoh; Screenplay: Hidefumi Kimura

References

External links
 
 TV Tokyo Site
 

2007 anime television series debuts
2007 manga
Anime composed by Hiroyuki Sawano
Brain's Base
Hidefumi Kimura
Mecha anime and manga
Anime with original screenplays
Shōnen manga
Television series set in the 2030s